Marek Ulrich (born 12 January 1997) is a German swimmer. He competed in the men's 50 metre backstroke event at the 2017 World Aquatics Championships. In 2014, he represented Germany at the 2014 Summer Youth Olympics held in Nanjing, China.

References

External links
 

1997 births
Living people
German male backstroke swimmers
Place of birth missing (living people)
Swimmers at the 2014 Summer Youth Olympics
Swimmers at the 2020 Summer Olympics
Swimmers at the 2015 European Games
European Games medalists in swimming
European Games silver medalists for Germany
European Games bronze medalists for Germany